I'll Play For You is Seals & Crofts' seventh studio album. The title cut reached #18 on the U.S. Billboard Hot 100 and #4 on the Adult Contemporary charts in the summer of 1975. It was equally successful in Canada (Pop #28, AC #2).  It also charted in New Zealand (#30). "Castles in the Sand" also charted in the U.S. and Canada, peaking at #21 U.S. AC, and #27 Can Pop.

Track listing 
All songs written by James Seals and Dash Crofts, except where noted.

 "I'll Play for You"
 "Golden Rainbow" (James Seals, Dash Crofts, Roger Johnson, Bobby Lichtig, Jim Varley)
 "Castles in the Sand"
 "Blue Bonnet Nation"
 "Ugly City"
 "Wayland the Rabbit"
 "Freaks Fret"
 "Truth Is But a Woman"
 "Fire and Vengeance"

Charts

Personnel 

Musicians
 Jim Seals – vocals (except on "Golden Rainbow"), guitar, banjo
 Dash Crofts – vocals (except on "Wayland the Rabbit"), acoustic and electric mandolins, mandola on "Castles in the Sand"
 Louie Shelton – guitar, banjo
 Ovid Stevens – slide guitar
 Jack Lenz – keyboards (including ARP synthesizer on "Fire and Vengeance"), flute on "I'll Play for You"
 David Paich – keyboards
 Wilton Felder – bass (except on "I'll Play for You" and "Castles in the Sand")
 Mike Porcaro – bass on "I'll Play for You" and "Castles in the Sand"
 Ed Greene – drums (except on "I'll Play for You" and "Golden Rainbow")
 Jim Varley – drums on "I'll Play for You"
 Jeff Porcaro – drums on "Golden Rainbow"
 Antoine Dearborn – percussion
 Gene Capriano, Bob Crosby, Jim Horn, Steve Leeds, and Henry Sigismonti – reeds
 Larry Ford, Paul Hubinon, Ron King, and Bobby Shew – trumpet
 Dick Hyde, John Leys, and Lew McCreary – trombone

Production
 Louie Shelton – producer
 Joe Bogan and Tom Knox – engineers
 Marcus Joseph – 2nd engineer
 Ivan Nagy – photography
 Robert Lockart – art direction and design

References

External links

1975 albums
Seals and Crofts albums
Warner Records albums